Alexis Nicolás Delgado Navarrete (born 31 December 1987) is a Chilean former footballer who played as a midfielder.

Career
A product of Huachipato, he had a stint with Villarreal in Spain alongside his fellow footballer Juan Abarca in 2006.

In his homeland, he also played for Iberia, Deportes Copiapó, Magallanes, Audax Italiano and Deportes Concepción.

Personal life
Both his father and his brother of the same name, Patricio, were footballers who played for Huachipato. In addition, he is the nephew of Sandro Navarrete, a former Chile international player at under-20 level.

References

External links

1987 births
Living people
People from Talcahuano
Association football midfielders
Chilean footballers
Chilean expatriate footballers
C.D. Huachipato footballers
Deportes Iberia footballers
Deportes Copiapó footballers
Deportes Magallanes footballers
Magallanes footballers
Audax Italiano footballers
Deportes Concepción (Chile) footballers
Chilean Primera División players
Tercera División de Chile players
Primera B de Chile players
Segunda División Profesional de Chile players
Chilean expatriate sportspeople in Spain
Expatriate footballers in Spain